Olivier Davidas (born 8 November 1981) is a retired French professional football midfielder.

Career
BornLe Havre, Davidas began his career 2000 with local side Le Havre AC.

External links
 
 French League Profile
 
 
 

1981 births
Living people
Footballers from Le Havre
Association football midfielders
French footballers
French people of Martiniquais descent
Le Havre AC players
Gazélec Ajaccio players
Ligue 2 players
Ligue 1 players